The Coming Global Superstorm is a 1999 book by Art Bell and Whitley Strieber, which warns that global warming might produce sudden and catastrophic climate change.

Thesis
First, the Gulf Stream and North Atlantic drift would generate a cordon of warm water around the North Pole, which in turn holds in a frozen mass of Arctic air. Second, if the North Atlantic drift were to shut down, that barrier would fail, releasing a flood of frozen air into the Northern Hemisphere, causing a sudden and drastic temperature shift.

The book discusses a possible cause of the failure of the Gulf Stream: the melting of the polar ice caps could drastically affect the ocean salinity of the North Atlantic drift by dumping a large quantity of freshwater into the world's oceans.

Bell and Strieber contend that such   destabilizations have occurred before, and cite seemingly impossible engineering feats by ancient civilizations which must have been catastrophically destroyed since they do not appear in the historical record. Among their examples is the archaeological ruins of Nan Madol, which the book claims were built with exacting tolerances and extremely heavy basalt materials, necessitating a high degree of technical competency. Since no such society exists in the modern record, or even in legend, the society must have been destroyed by dramatic means.

While other explanations beside a global meteorological event are possible, a correlating evidence set is presented in the woolly mammoth. Strieber and Bell assert that since mammoths have been found preserved with food still in their mouths and undigested in their stomachs, these animals must have been killed quickly, in otherwise normal conditions. They were preserved so well by quick freezing, which is taken as evidence of a rapid onset of a global blizzard or similar event.

In popular culture
Interspersed with the analytical parts of the book are a series of interlinked short fictional scenarios, written in italics, describing what might transpire today if a destabilization of the North Atlantic Current were to occur. The fictional accounts of "current events" as the meteorological situation deteriorates provided background for, and is the source material of, the 2004 science fiction film The Day After Tomorrow. Indeed, some events from the book are portrayed in the film with little modification, such as the failure of the Gulf Stream which freezes over large portions of the northern hemisphere including New York City.

See also
Arnold Federbush, author of Ice!, a 1978 novel with similar themes

References

External links
What Is A Global Superstorm Archived website

1999 non-fiction books
1999 in the environment
Futurology books
Environmental non-fiction books
Books by Whitley Strieber
Non-fiction books adapted into films
Climate change books
Collaborative non-fiction books
Atria Publishing Group books